Eugent Zeka (born 21 February 1974) is an Italian football coach who was the Sporting Director of KF Vllaznia in the Albanian Superliga.

Playing career

Early life
Zeka was born in Shkodër in 1974 where he attended Jordan Misja High School. He moved to Tiranë where he studied teaching and football coaching at the Vojo Kushi University of Sports and Physical Education between 1992 and 1996, where he was taught by Shyqyri Rreli, Miqo Papadhopulli, Bahri Ishka, Bujar Kasmi, Parid Beliu. and Met Spahija. He returned to his hometown Shkodër after graduating from university, where he worked as a physical education teacher at Oblikë High School for two years before moving to Italy in 1998. During his time in Albania he played as a professional footballer for KF Studenti, KF Porto as well as KF Shkodra in the Albanian First Division between 1992 and 1998.

Managerial career

Youth teams

Zeka has worked as technical director, head coach, technical assistant and talent scout at various football clubs in Liguria in Italy. Among the most important are Virtus Entella, Genoa CFC, US Sestri Levante and Real Fieschi. Wherever Zeka has worked he has developed and achieved excellent results. Among his most important successes are the Italian championship won as a technical assistant with the U18 team of Virtus Entella, all tournaments won as manager of the Virtus Entella U15 team, and the championship was  won after 35 years with the U18 team of the USD Sestri Levante.

KF Laçi
Zeka became the head coach of Albanian Superliga side KF Laçi on 25 March 2016 following the departure of Stavri Nica. This was his first role as a head coach of a senior professional club in Albania. He guided his side to a goalless draw against title challengers Partizani Tirana in his first game on 2 April, and won 1–0 in his second game in charge against the Albanian champions Skënderbeu Korçë in the first leg of the Albanian Cup semi-finals.

KF Vllaznia
Zeka was appointed Sporting Director of KF Vllaznia in the Albanian Superliga on 16 September 2016, replacing Armir Grima. He resigned in January 2018.

References

1974 births
Living people
Footballers from Shkodër
Albanian footballers
Association football midfielders
S.S. Verbania Calcio players
Albanian expatriate footballers
Expatriate footballers in Italy
Albanian expatriate sportspeople in Italy
Albanian football managers
KF Laçi managers
Kategoria e Parë players
Kategoria Superiore managers